The Sanigs were a tribe inhabiting Western Georgian/Abkhazia during antiquity. Their ethnic identity is obscure and is the subject of a controversy. They are first attested in the works of Pliny, Arrian  and Memnon of Heraclea. Some scholars consider them to be Zans (ancestors of Mingrelian and Laz peoples), while others maintain that they were proto-Svans. There is also a consideration that they may have been somewhat similar to the Zygii tribe. According to Arrian, they inhabited the area around Sebastopolis (modern Sukhumi). In favour of the Sanigs Kartvelian (either Zan or Svan) origin, it is important to mention some modern Georgian surnames such as: Sanikidze, Sanikiani, Sanigiani, Sanaia.

References

Ancient peoples of Georgia (country)
Tribes in Greco-Roman historiography